The 2018 Czech Open was the tenth event of the 2018 ITTF World Tour. The event was organised by the Czech Table Tennis Association, under the authority of the International Table Tennis Federation (ITTF). It took place from 23 to 26 August in Olomouc, Czech Republic.

Men's singles

Seeds

Draw

Top half

Bottom half

Finals

Women's singles

Seeds

Draw

Top half

Bottom half

Finals

Men's doubles

Seeds

Draw

Women's doubles

Seeds

Draw

References

External links
 Tournament page on ITTF website

Czech Open
Czech Open (table tennis)
Table tennis competitions in the Czech Republic
International sports competitions hosted by the Czech Republic
Sport in Olomouc
Czech Open (table tennis)